The Tamluk Junction railway station in the Indian state of West Bengal, serves Tamluk, India in Purba Medinipur district. It is on the Panskura–Haldia line. It is under the jurisdiction of South Eastern Railway zone. Tamluk Junction railway station is one of the busiest railway stations of Kharagpur railway division.

History
Tamluk Junction railway station is situated in Tamluk station Road, Tamluk, West Bengal. Station code is TMZ. It is a small but busiest railway station in Panskura–Haldia line. Neighbourhood stations are Sahid Matangini and Nandakumar and Keshabpur. Digha–Malda Town Express, Vishakapatnam–Digha Superfast Express, Samudra Kanya Superfast Express, Tamralipta Express, Kandari Express, Paharia Express, Digha–Howrah Super AC express, Digha–Asansol Express and Local EMU trains Haldia–Howrah Fast Local, Digha–Panskura Local, Mecheda–Digha Local, Haldia–Panskura Local, Howrah–Haldia Local trains stop here. The Panskura–Durgachak line was opened in 1968, at a time when Haldia Port was being constructed. It was subsequently extended to Haldia. The Tamluk–Digha line was opened in 2004. The Panskura–Haldia line was electrified in 1974–76. All lines were electrified with 25 kV AC overhead system. EMU train services between Panskura and Haldia introduced in 1976 and direct EMU services between Howrah and Haldia in 1979.

Gallery

References

External links
Trains at Tamluk Junction

Railway stations in Purba Medinipur district
Kolkata Suburban Railway stations